E-Daakhil is an online portal launched by the Indian The National Consumer Disputes Redressal Commission (NCDRC) in September 2020 for facilitation of offline and online complaints relating to the Consumer Protection Act, 2019 by consumers. The portal is available across all State Consumer Redressal Commissions.

History and objectives 

E-Daakhil is an online portal launched on 7th September 2020 by The National Consumer Disputes Redressal Commission (NCDRC) for online and offline filing of complaints by aggrieved consumers and also facilitates of digital payments related to it. The portal is available in Consumer Redressal Commissions of various states of India.

Facilities 

The commission claims that the portal has a number of benefits.:
 Consumers can file complaints from anywhere irrespective of their physical location.
 Consumer commissions in various states can scrutinise the complaints online and can accept, reject or forward it for further processing at respective state level commissions.
 Fees payable for the complaints can be done online or direct.
 Additional features include filing online notices, downloading the respective case document link related to any filed case, downloading the court hearing video, filing the reply in writing for issues raised by other party, getting alert subscription messages through mail or sms and other issues like additional filing by the complainant through online can be done.
 Integration of E-Daakhil portal with the common service centres to help e-filing by rural consumers.

Up to November 2021, 9800 complaints were lodged in the E-Daakhil portal across various consumer commissions of India, and out of these around 213 cases were resolved through this portal.

Related articles 

 State Consumer Disputes Redressal Commission

References

External links 
 Official Website

Indian websites
Consumer protection in India